The following radio stations broadcast on AM frequency 1650 kHz: 1650 AM is a Regional broadcast frequency.

Argentina
 LRI 227 in Pilar, Buenos Aires

Canada

United States
All stations are Class B stations.

External links
 Radio Locator list of stations on 1650

References

Lists of radio stations by frequency